The Ruins of Beverast is a German blackened doom metal project formed by Alexander von Meilenwald in 2003. Six albums have been released under the moniker through Ván Records. Since 2013, von Meilenwald has also performed live with an expanded line-up under the band's name. Apart from occasional appearances by session musicians, he continues to perform all instruments and vocals on the band's studio material. Der Spiegel called the third album Foulest Semen of a Sheltered Elite a "highly complex" album and rated it 8 out of 10. The album Exuvia was released in 2017. It was well received by the metal press. Metal Hammer Germany rated it 6 out of 7, metal.de 9 out of 10.

Discography

Albums 
 Unlock the Shrine (2004)
 Rain Upon the Impure (2006)
 Foulest Semen of a Sheltered Elite (2009)
 Blood Vaults – The Blazing Gospel of Heinrich Kramer (2013)
 Exuvia (2017)
 The Thule Grimoires (2021)

EPs 
 Takitum Tootem! (2016)

Compilations 
 Enchanted by Gravemould I (2011)
 Untitled split with Almyrkvi (2020)

Limited editions 
 The Furious Waves of Damnation (2003)
 Gott in uns (2007) (split with Deathgate Arkanum, Nihil Nocturne and Anti)
 Hours of the Aequinox (2007)
 Untitled split with Urfaust (2007)

References

External links 

 
 The Ruins of Beverast Bandcamp

German black metal musical groups
German doom metal musical groups
Musical groups established in 2003
One-man bands